Joslin Branch is a stream in Cass County in the U.S. state of Missouri.

Joslin Branch was named after the local Joslin family.

See also
List of rivers of Missouri

References

Rivers of Cass County, Missouri
Rivers of Missouri